Amit Schejter (Amit Meshulam Schejter) is Professor of Communication Studies at Ben-Gurion University of the Negev in Israel and Visiting Professor of Communications and co-director of the Institute for Information Policy at the Donald P. Bellisario College of Communications of the Pennsylvania State University. He is currently serving as President of Oranim College.

Academic career
Schejter received his LL.B. from the Hebrew University of Jerusalem in 1986, his M.S. in mass communications from Boston University in 1991 and his Ph.D. in communication and information policy from Rutgers in 1995. Between 1997 and 2000 he was on the faculty at Tel Aviv University. Since 2004 he has been at Penn State and since 2012 at Ben-Gurion University of the Negev where he previously (2014-2018) served as Head of the Department of Communication Studies and as Dean of the Faculty of Humanities and Social Sciences (2018-2020).

His research focuses on the relationship between media and justice. It analyzes how media policies have an effect on the public interest; minority rights; the unequal distribution of communication resources, and the silencing of the public's voice, in particular that of members of marginalized communities. Central among the theoretical approaches to justice he currently investigates is the capabilities approach.

He has also written extensively about media regulation, critiquing policies regarding broadcasting, cable television, public broadcasting, mobile services, and audiovisual services in Israel as well as low power FM, network neutrality and universal service policies in the U.S. As a member of the International Media Concentration Group, he analyzed (with Moran Yemini) media concentration in Israel between 1984-2013.

He is the author or editor of 7 books and more than 60 journal articles, law reviews and book chapters in five languages and has been cited in congressional and Knesset hearings. Critics have described his books as deserving of "high praise for their energetic and creative investigation",  as "must-read for policy makers, educators, industry leaders and others interested in bringing U.S. communications into the 21st century," and as "display[ing] enviable intellectual courage". In 2017 he received (with Noam Tirosh) the Israel Communication Association's Outstanding Book of the Year Award. He serves as the founding editor of the Journal of Information Policy and was a member of the scientific management of the Israeli Center of Research Excellence (ICORE) "Learning in a NetworKed Society" (LINKS) (2013-2019).

Professional career
Between 1988-1989 and 1992-1993 Schejter served as bureau chief and senior advisor to Israeli ministers of education and culture Yitzhak Navon and Shulamit Aloni. Between 1993 and 1997 he was director of legal affairs and international relations at the Israel Broadcasting Authority where he co-authored the Nakdi Report. In 2000 he was appointed vice president for regulatory affairs at Cellcom (Israel), where he attracted public attention when attacking the government's caving in to pressures of Bezeq, the national telco, and refusing to undergo a polygraph test enforced on the corporation's senior management.

Professor Schejter has been involved in public life in Israel and the United States. In Israel, he has served on a number of public committees charged with studying and developing new policies regarding a wide range of issues. In 2007-2008 he headed the Future of American Telecommunications Working Group, which proposed a telecommunications and media policy agenda for the incoming Obama administration, and he has addressed regulators, and academic audiences worldwide. Most recently, in 2015 he headed a government panel that proposed sweeping changes to the Israeli media industry.

He currently sits on the board of directors of the Jaffa Theatre – The Stage for Arab-Hebrew Culture, and of the Association for Civil Rights in Israel as well as on the Israel Press Council. He is the founding co-director of the Shulamit Aloni Prize. As an avid fan of Hapoel Tel Aviv he for a few years wrote a popular column on the fans' website.

Books
The Wonder Phone in the Land of Miracles: Mobile Telephony in Israel (Hampton Press, 2008) (with Akiba Cohen and Dafna Lemish)
Muting Israeli Democracy: How Media and Cultural Policy Undermine Freedom of Expression (University of Illinois Press, 2009)
... And Communications for All: A Policy Agenda for a New Administration (Lexington Books, 2009)
Beyond Broadband Access: Developing Data-Based Information Policy Strategies (Fordham University, 2013) (with Richard D. Taylor)
Media in Transition (Tzivonim Publishers, 2015, in Hebrew) in honor of professor Dan Caspi (with Nelly Elias, Galit Nimrod, and Zvi Reich) 
A Justice-Based Approach to New Media Policy (Palgrave Macmillan, 2017) (with Noam Tirosh)
Learning in a Networked Society: Spontaneous and Designed Technology Enhanced Learning Communities (Springer, 2019) (With Yael Kali and Ayelet Baram Tsabari)

References

Pennsylvania State University faculty
Living people
Academic staff of Ben-Gurion University of the Negev
1961 births